Cate Kennedy (born 1963) is an Australian author based in Victoria.

Life and career
Kennedy graduated from the University of Canberra and has also taught at several colleges, including The University of Melbourne. She is the author of the highly acclaimed novel The World Beneath, which won the People's Choice Award in the NSW Premier's Literary Awards in 2010. It was also shortlisted for The Age fiction prize 2010 and the ASA Barbara Jefferis Award 2010, among others. She is a short-story writer whose work has twice won The Age Short Story Competition and has appeared in a range of publications, including The New Yorker. Her collection, Dark Roots, was shortlisted for the Steele Rudd Award in the Queensland Premier's Literary Awards and for the Australian Literature Society Gold Medal. Kennedy is also the author of the travel memoir Sing, and Don’t Cry, and the poetry collections Joyflight and Signs of Other Fires. Her book The Taste of River Water: New and Selected Poems by Cate Kennedy, which was published in May 2011, won the Victorian Premier's Literary Awards CJ Dennis Prize for Poetry.

Awards

 2013: Steele Rudd Award. Winner for Like a House on Fire
 2013: The Stella Prize. Shortlisted for Like a House on Fire 
 2011: Victorian Premier's Literary Awards CJ Dennis Prize for Poetry
 2004: IP Picks. Winner for Joyflight
 2004: Ginninderra Press Short Story Competition. Winner
 2002: The Vincent Buckley Poetry Prize for Signs of Other Fires
 2001 Victorian Premier's Literary Award. Highly Commended for Signs of Other Fires
 2000 & 2001: The Age Short Story Award
 1997: ANUTECH Literary Prize. Short Story Winner for White Flight
 1996 & 1997: HQ/HarperCollins Short Story Competition. Shortlisted
 1994 & 1995: Scarlett Stiletto. Winner

Other awards: The Herald/Sun Short Story Award

The 2007 Sisters in Crime Scarlett Stiletto Awards include a category named for Kennedy: "The Cate Kennedy Award for Best New Talent ($350)"

Selected works

Poetry, short story collections
 Signs of Other Fires (Five Islands Press, c2001) 
 Joyflight (Interactive Press, 2004)  API review
 Dark Roots (Scribe, 2006)  review
 Crucible and Other Poems (Picaro Press, 2006)
 The Taste of River Water (Scribe, 2011) 
 Like a House on Fire (Scribe, 2012)

Short stories

Novels
 The World Beneath (Scribe, 2009)

Edited
 Labour of love : tales from the world of midwives, with Amanda Tattam (Macmillan, 2005)
 Love & desire : four modern Australian novellas (Five Mile Press, 2007)
 The best Australian stories 2011 (Black Inc, 2011)
 Australian love stories (Inkerman & Blunt, 2014)

Memoirs
 Sing, and Don't Cry : a Mexican Journal, (Transit Lounge, 2005)

References

Sources
 "Canberra Writers win ANUTECH Competition", in The ANU Reporter, Vol. 28 No. 12

External links
 Cate Kennedy, Scribe Publications Accessed 17 July 2007
 Di Morrissey and Cate Kennedy in conversation with Richard Fidler, ABC The Backyard, 6 November 2006
 Hagemann, Helen "Review of Joyflight" in API Network, June 2005
 Cate Kennedy bio for Booked Out Agency Accessed: 2007-07-23
Sullivan, Jane (2006) "Back to her roots" in The Age 2006-09-14 Accessed: 2007-07-23

Living people
1963 births
Australian poets
Australian women short story writers
Australian memoirists
Australian crime writers
Australian travel writers
University of Canberra alumni
Academic staff of the University of Melbourne
People from Louth, Lincolnshire
Women travel writers
Australian women memoirists
Australian women novelists
Australian women poets
Women crime writers
Australian Book Review people